Metaborborus is a genus of flies belonging to the family Sphaeroceridae, the lesser dung flies.

Species
M. calcaratus (Vanschuytbroeck, 1948)
M. flavior (Vanschuytbroeck, 1959)
M. glaber Norrbom & Kim, 1985
M. hackmani Norrbom & Kim, 1985
M. mitus Norrbom & Kim, 1985
M. parastichosus Norrbom & Kim, 1985
M. pilifer (Vanschuytbroeck, 1948)
M. pollinosus (Hackman, 1965)
M. ruwenzoriensis Norrbom & Kim, 1985
M. saliens (Duda, 1923)
M. schumanni (Papp, 1980)
M. spinifer (Vanschuytbroeck, 1948)
M. stichosus Norrbom & Kim, 1985
M. superciliosus Norrbom & Kim, 1985
M. trichosus Norrbom & Kim, 1985
M. wittei Norrbom & Kim, 1985

References

Sphaeroceridae
Diptera of Africa
Diptera of Asia
Sphaeroceroidea genera